NBA Live 08 is the 2007 installment of the NBA Live series by EA Sports. It was released for the PlayStation 2, Xbox 360, PlayStation 3, Wii, Windows and PlayStation Portable. This is the first NBA video game to include all three next-generation consoles, the first game to be released for Sony's PlayStation 3, and the last NBA Live game for the Windows platform.

Reception

The game received "mixed or average reviews" on all platforms according to video game review aggregator Metacritic.  In Japan, Famitsu gave it a score of all four eights for the PlayStation 3 and Xbox 360 versions; one seven, two eights, and one seven for the PSP version; and all four sevens for the PlayStation 2 version.

See also
NBA 2K8

References

External links

NBA Live 08 official website

2007 video games
Electronic Arts games
HB Studios games
Mobile games
Multiplayer and single-player video games
NBA Live
Nintendo Wi-Fi Connection games
PlayStation 2 games
PlayStation 3 games
PlayStation Portable games
Video games developed in Canada
Video games set in 2007
Video games set in 2008
Wii Wi-Fi games
Windows games
Xbox 360 games